Douglas Anthony "D.J."  Peterson (born December 31, 1991) is an American professional baseball third baseman who is currently a free agent. He was drafted by the Seattle Mariners 12th overall in the first round of the 2013 Major League Baseball draft out of the University of New Mexico, becoming the highest drafted player in program history.

Career

Amateur
Peterson attended Gilbert High School in Gilbert, Arizona. He earned Louisville Slugger High School All-American honors. Peterson enrolled at the University of New Mexico to play college baseball for the New Mexico Lobos. As a freshman in 2011, Peterson led the Lobos in nearly every offensive category, earning Freshman All-American honors. He led the Lobos to the 2011 Mountain West Conference baseball tournament Tournament championship, earning tournament most valuable player honors.

In 2012, Peterson improved upon his freshman season, leading the Mountain West Conference in batting average, home runs, and runs batted in leading the Lobos to both the regular season and 2012 Mountain West Conference baseball tournament championships. Peterson earned First Team All-American and Mountain West Conference Co-Player of the Year honors. In 2012, he played collegiate summer baseball with the Hyannis Harbor Hawks of the Cape Cod Baseball League.

Seattle Mariners
The Seattle Mariners selected Peterson in the first round, with the 12th overall selection, of the 2013 MLB draft. He signed with the Mariners for a $2,759,100 signing bonus and spent 2013 with both the Everett AquaSox and Clinton LumberKings, posting a combined .303 batting average with 13 home runs and 47 RBIs in 55 total games between the two teams. In 2014, he played for the High Desert Mavericks and Jackson Generals where he slashed .297/.360/.552 with 31 home runs, 111 RBIs, and a .912 OPS in 123 total games, and in 2015, he played with Jackson where he batted .223 with seven home runs and 44 RBIs in 93 games. He also played in four games for the Tacoma Rainers at the end of the season. Peterson spent 2016 with both Jackson and Tacoma where he collected a .264 batting average with 19 home runs and 78 RBIs in 119 games between the two clubs. The Mariners added him to their 40-man roster after the 2016 season.

Peterson began 2017 with Tacoma. The Mariners designated him for assignment on July 30, 2017.

Chicago White Sox
The Chicago White Sox claimed Peterson off of waivers on August 6, and assigned him to the Charlotte Knights, where he finished the season. In 128 games between Tacoma and Charlotte, he slashed .252/.315/.404 with 16 home runs and 63 RBIs. On September 17, Peterson was claimed off waivers by the Cincinnati Reds. He was released on December 18, 2018.

On January 12, 2019, Peterson signed a minor league deal with the White Sox. He was released on June 8, 2019.

Sugar Land Skeeters
On July 29, 2019, Peterson signed with the Sugar Land Skeeters of the Atlantic League of Professional Baseball. He became a free agent following the season.

On February 5, 2020, Peterson signed with the Tigres de Quintana Roo of the Mexican League. However, the Mexican League season was canceled in late June due to the COVID-19 pandemic. He later re-signed to play with the Sugar Land Skeeters of the Constellation Energy League (a makeshift 4-team independent league created as a result of the pandemic) for the 2020 season.

Lexington Legends
On May 4, 2021, Peterson signed with the Lexington Legends of the Atlantic League of Professional Baseball. In 45 games, Peterson slashed .311/.418/.683 with 15 home runs and 44 RBIs.

Cleburne Railroaders
On August 3, 2021, Peterson was traded to the Cleburne Railroaders of the American Association of Professional Baseball for cash considerations.  In 31 games, Peterson slashed .372/.450/.823 with 14 home runs and 37 RBIs. He was released by the team following the season on November 11, 2021.

Colorado Rockies
On November 24, 2021, Peterson signed a minor league contract with the Colorado Rockies. He elected free agency on November 10, 2022.

Personal life
Peterson's younger brother, Dustin, was selected in the second round of the 2013 MLB Draft, and currently plays for the Milwaukee Brewers organization. He is married to Breanna (nee Macha) Peterson, a former softball player for the Arizona State Sun Devils who is currently a pitching coach for the University of New Mexico Lobos softball team.

References

External links

1991 births
Living people
People from Gilbert, Arizona
Sportspeople from the Phoenix metropolitan area
Baseball players from Arizona
New Mexico Lobos baseball players
All-American college baseball players
Everett AquaSox players
Clinton LumberKings players
High Desert Mavericks players
Hyannis Harbor Hawks players
Jackson Generals (Southern League) players
Tacoma Rainiers players
Charlotte Knights players
Lexington Legends players
Louisville Bats players
Sugar Land Skeeters players
Surprise Saguaros players
Peoria Javelinas players